Fernow is a surname. Notable people with the surname include:

Bernhard Fernow (1851–1923), American forestry academic
Berthold Fernow (1837–1908), American historian, writer and librarian
Dominick Fernow, American musician
Karl Ludwig Fernow (1763–1808), German art critic and archaeologist